James Gallagher Fraser (May 29, 1936 – April 18, 2020) was an American professional football linebacker and punter who played in the American Football League (AFL) and the National Football League (NFL). In the 1959 NFL draft, Fraser was selected in the 21st round (250th overall) by the Cleveland Browns. He played six seasons for the AFL's Denver Broncos (1962–1964), Kansas City Chiefs (1965), and Boston Patriots (1966) and the NFL's New Orleans Saints (1968).

Fraser led the AFL in average yards per punt with the Broncos from 1962–1964.

Following his retirement, Fraser became a coach, serving at Cornell, Illinois, Trinity Valley School, and Episcopal High School in Alexandria, Virginia. He spent 70 summers at Camp Tecumseh on Lake Winnipesaukee in New Hampshire as a camper, counselor, and coach.

Fraser died from the coronavirus on April 18, 2020.

References

External links
 

1936 births
2020 deaths
American Football League All-Star players
American Football League players
American football linebackers
American football punters
Boston Patriots players
Deaths from the COVID-19 pandemic in Pennsylvania
Denver Broncos (AFL) players
New Orleans Saints players
Kansas City Chiefs players
Players of American football from Philadelphia
Wisconsin Badgers football players